The George Wilson Memorial Cup is a competition open to the reserve football teams of member clubs of the NIFL Premiership.  Initially it was open to all members of the B Division, both "attached and unattached" (i.e. reserve sides and independent intermediate clubs), but since 1977–78 it has been limited to reserve sides only.

History
Founded in the 1952–53 season in memory of Crusaders official, George Wilson, the final has been traditionally held at Crusaders' home ground Seaview (with a few exceptions when matches have been held at Taylor's Avenue (Carrickfergus), Ballymena Showgrounds and Mourneview Park).  Appropriately, the first winners were Crusaders Reserves.

The format has varied over the years between league format, straight knock-out and group format.

Past winners

 1952–53 Crusaders Reserves
 1953–54 Linfield Swifts
 1954–55 Coleraine Reserves
 1955–56 Ballyclare Comrades
 1956–57 Distillery II
 1957–58 Ards II
 1958–59 Larne
 1959–60 Larne
 1960–61 Ballyclare Comrades
 1961–62 Linfield Swifts
 1962–63 Ballyclare Comrades
 1963–64 Glenavon Reserves
 1964–65 Dundela
 1965–66 Glentoran II
 1966–67 Glentoran II
 1967–68 Dundela
 1968–69 Larne
 1969–70 not played
 1970–71 Larne
 1971–72 Dundela
 1972–73 Brantwood
 1973–74 Dungannon Swifts
 1974–75 Dundela
 1975–76 Limavady United
 1976–77 Banbridge Town F.C.
 1977–78 Larne Olympic
 1978–79 Larne Olympic
 1979–80 Glentoran II
 1980–81 Linfield Swifts
 1981–82 Distillery II
 1982–83 Ards II
 1983–84 Linfield Swifts
 1984–85 Linfield Swifts
 1985–86 Coleraine Reserves
 1986–87 Glentoran II
 1987–88 Distillery II
 1988–89 Linfield Swifts
 1989–90 Ballymena United Reserves
 1990–91 Ballymena United Reserves
 1991–92 Coleraine Reserves
 1992–93 Bangor Reserves
 1993–94 Ballyclare Comrades Reserves
 1994–95 Bangor Reserves
 1995–96 Coleraine Reserves
 1996–97 Portadown Reserves
 1997–98 Bangor Reserves
 1998–99 Linfield Swifts
 1999–00 Cliftonville Olympic
 2000–01 Glentoran II
 2001–02 Glentoran II
 2002–03 Glentoran II
 2003–04 Dungannon Swifts Reserves
 2004–05 Glentoran II
 2005–06 Dungannon Swifts Reserves
 2006–07 Crusaders Reserves
 2007–08 Cliftonville Olympic
 2008–09 Linfield Swifts
 2009–10 Glentoran II
 2010–11 Linfield Swifts
 2011–12 Glentoran II
 2012–13 Cliftonville Olympic
 2013–14 Glentoran II
 2014–15 Crusaders Reserves
 2015–16 Cliftonville Olympic
 2016–17 Cliftonville Olympic
 2017–18 Harland & Wolff Welders U20
 2018–19 Knockbreda Reserves
 2019–20 not played due to coronavirus pandemic

Performance by club

References
 Daily Mirror Northern Ireland Soccer Yearbook 2008-09 (Ed. Malcolm Brodie) Page 79
 1996/97 George Wilson Cup Final Programme (Glenavon Reserves vs Portadown Reserves) Page 4

See also
IFA Reserve League

Association football cup competitions in Northern Ireland
Reserve team football in Northern Ireland
1952 establishments in Northern Ireland
Recurring sporting events established in 1952